The Assistants is a Canadian sitcom created by Will McRobb and Chris Viscardi. In the United States, the series aired on The N.

Premise
Gillian, an aspiring actress, has become an assistant to film producer Zak Del Toro in the hopes of jump starting her filmmaking career. She with Zak's other assistants, Danny, Rigby and Nate, fulfill Zak's tasks at Kinky Bunny Picture, typically involving an undesirable task.

Cast

Main
Britt Irvin as Gillian Hughes – The newest assistant of Kinky Bunny Pictures. She aspires to be a director and directs movies on the side. Gillian is new and naive, coming to Kinky Bunny without knowing about the outrageous and eccentric tasks that Zak has his workers fulfill. She is the kind and generous one out of the group but has proved that she can bite back (especially at Rigby).
Meaghan Rath as Rigby Hastings – A manipulative and often difficult person to get along with. She is usually seen giving back handed and insulting comments or exploiting situations. Rigby was the only girl who worked at Kinky Bunny until Gillian arrived-which sparked a competitive jealousy. Despite her tough personality, her no-joke manner does get things done and like the other assistants, her creative moments have helped situations.
Brendan Penny as Danny Newell – The assistant most like a "regular guy" and the most absent-minded, he often fumbles his duties. He is later chosen as the star of Gillian's independent film. He has a crush on Gillian.
Michael B. Jordan as Nate Warren – The assistant who always gets stuck with Zak's oddest and usually grossest jobs. He puts a lot of effort into doing his tasks and also trying to impress Gillian's best friend.
Zak Santiago as Zak Del Toro – The head of Kinky Bunny Pictures. He often gives his assistants ridiculous duties to do.

Recurring
Jocelyne Loewen as Hope
Melanie Papalia as Sandra
Ali Mukaddam as Heston Nidalu

Guest
Brendan Meyer as Barry Collins
Eva Marcille as Alicia James
Katharine Isabelle as Paulette Reubin

Production
The show was produced and filmed at Tom Lynch Company Studios with funding from The N Original Productions. The series consisted of 13 22-minute episodes.

Episodes

References

External links

2000s Canadian teen sitcoms
2009 Canadian television series debuts
2009 Canadian television series endings
English-language television shows
The N original programming
Television shows set in Los Angeles
Television series created by Will McRobb and Chris Viscardi